"I Go Wild" is a song by English rock band the Rolling Stones featured on their 1994 album Voodoo Lounge. Credited to Mick Jagger and Keith Richards, "I Go Wild" is largely a Jagger composition.

On its creation, Jagger said in 1994, "'I Go Wild', I suppose, is the one I play (guitar) on most. I mean, I just created it on guitar with Charlie [Watts], as a groove. And we more or less had the whole song down before we took it to anyone else." On the song overall, Jagger said, " I like that song. I really got into the lyrics on that one. One of the wordy ones."

A straightforward rock song, "I Go Wild"'s lyrics tell of the singer's relationship with an unnamed "femme fatale";

"I Go Wild" was recorded between the months of July and August and November and December 1993 at Sandymount Studios, Ireland and A&M Recording Studios, Los Angeles. With Jagger on lead vocals and electric guitar, Richards and Ron Wood accompany him on electric guitars. Charlie Watts performs drums while Darryl Jones performs bass. Chuck Leavell performs the song's organ while Phil Jones incorporate percussion. Jagger, Richards, Bernard Fowler, and Ivan Neville perform backing vocals.

"I Go Wild" was released as the fourth and final single from Voodoo Lounge.  Following its UK release on 3 July 1995, it reached number 29 on the UK singles chart. A video was shot at Ex-templo de San Lázaro in Mexico City immediately before the Stones' fourteen stadium tour of South America. The song was performed throughout the 1994-1995 Voodoo Lounge Tour; a live version from 1994 appeared on the maxi-single, and a 1995 live performance was released in 2016 on Totally Stripped.

Charts

References

1995 singles
The Rolling Stones songs
1994 songs
Songs written by Jagger–Richards
Song recordings produced by Don Was
Song recordings produced by Jagger–Richards
Music videos directed by Kevin Kerslake